Ipomoea alba, sometimes called the tropical white morning-glory or moonflower or moon vine, is a species of night-blooming morning glory, native to tropical and subtropical regions of North and South America, from  Argentina to northern Mexico, Arizona, Florida and the West Indies. Though formerly classified as genus Calonyction, species aculeatum, it is now properly assigned to genus Ipomoea, subgenus Quamoclit, section Calonyction.

Description
It is a perennial, herbaceous liana growing to a height of 5–30 m tall with twining stems. The leaves are entire or three-lobed, 5–15 cm long, with a 5–20 cm long stem. The flowers are fragrant, white or pink, and large, 8–14 cm diameter. The flowers open quickly in the evening and last through the night, remaining open until touched by the morning dew. On overcast days, the blossoms may remain open for longer.  The flowers also tend to remain open longer during cool temperatures - which may also cause the segments to snag or tear as they open.

The name moonflower derives from their blooming in the evening and their being round in shape like a full moon.

Historical use

The Mesoamerican civilizations used the Ipomoea alba morning glory to convert the latex from the Castilla elastica tree to produce bouncing rubber balls. The sulfur in this morning glory served to cross-link the rubber, a process predating Charles Goodyear's discovery of vulcanization by at least 3,000 years.

Cultivation
The species is widely cultivated as an ornamental plant for its flowers. In areas too cold for winter survival, it can be grown as an annual plant. Since it is of tropical origin, it flowers best under a summer short day photoperiod.  Though it can be successfully flowered in the north, its flowering is impaired by excessively long summer days.  Thus, it often does not set buds and bloom until early autumn when daylight length is once again near 12 hours.  Propagation is usually by seed. The seed resembles a small, brownish nut, and should be nicked with a file and then soaked overnight before planting. In some areas, it is an invasive species which can cause problems in agricultural settings.

References

alba
Flora of North America
Plants described in 1753
Taxa named by Carl Linnaeus
Night-blooming plants
Flora of South America